Museo Eduardo Carrillo is the only Artist Endowed Foundation in the United States devoted to the work of a Mexican-American artist. Museo presents the life and work of Eduardo Carrillo (1937-1997), former professor of art at the University of California-Santa Cruz (1972-1997). He graduated from UCLA with a Bachelor of Arts and a master's in the early 1960s. His 1979 mural Father Hidalgo in Front of the Church of Dolores is located in Olvera Street in downtown Los Angeles. Eduardo Carrillo: A Life of Engagement, an award-winning biographical documentary film by Chilean director Pedro Pablo Celedón, was released in 2015 to highlight the artist's life. The documentary will examine Carrillo's life trajectory from Los Angeles, California as well as explores his connection to Baja California, Mexico, his ancestral homeland. A major retrospective is in development through the Crocker Art Museum, and is scheduled to open in January 2016. 

Museo also awards the annual Eduardo Carrillo Scholarship, which aims to help artists refine their skills in painting, sculpture, and drawing. Since 1997 the scholarship has been awarded to almost 200 students from UC Santa Cruz. There are plans to create a physical space in Baja California to showcase Carrillo's work in-conjunction with its online form.

References

External links 
Museo Eduardo Carrillo Website
 Museo Eduardo Carrillo at Google Cultural Institute
Virtual art museums and galleries